In mathematics, infinity plus one is a concept which has a well-defined formal meaning in some number systems, and may refer to:

 Transfinite numbers, numbers that are larger than all finite numbers
 Cardinal numbers, representations of sizes (cardinalities) of abstract sets, which may be infinite
 Ordinal numbers, representations of order types of well-ordered sets, which may also be infinite
 Hyperreal numbers, an extension of the real number system that contains infinite and infinitesimal numbers
 Surreal numbers, another extension of the real numbers, that contain the hyperreal and all transfinite ordinal numbers

English phrases
Infinity